Martin Nelson Johnson (March 3, 1850October 21, 1909) was an American attorney and politician who served as a United States representative and senator from North Dakota.

Early life and education
Born to Norwegian immigrants in Racine County, Wisconsin, he moved with his parents to Decorah, Iowa, the same year. He was taught at home and attended the country schools; in 1873 he graduated from the law department of the University of Iowa at Iowa City.

Career 
and taught two years in the California Military Academy at Oakland, California and returned to Iowa in 1875, was admitted to the bar in 1876 and commenced practice in Decorah. He was a member of the Iowa House of Representatives in 1877 and a member of the Iowa Senate from 1878 to 1882. He was a presidential elector on the Republican ticket in 1876.

Johnson moved to Dakota Territory in 1882 and engaged in agricultural pursuits; he was prosecuting attorney of Nelson County from 1886 to 1890 and was a member of the constitutional convention of North Dakota in 1889. In 1889 he was an unsuccessful Republican candidate for election to the U.S. Senate, and was elected a Representative to the Fifty-second and to the three succeeding Congresses, serving from March 4, 1891 to March 4, 1899. He was not a candidate for renomination in 1898, having become a candidate for Senator; his candidacy was unsuccessful 1899, but he was later elected and served from March 4, 1909, until his death in Fargo, North Dakota in 1909. While in the Senate, he was chairman of the Committee to Investigate Trespassers Upon Indian Lands (Sixty-first Congress). Johnson died of Bright's disease in Fargo. Interment was in the City Cemetery, Petersburg, North Dakota.

See also
List of United States Congress members who died in office (1900–49)

References

Martin N. Johnson, late a senator from North Dakota, Memorial addresses delivered in the House of Representatives and Senate frontispiece 1910

1850 births
1909 deaths
People from Racine County, Wisconsin
American people of Norwegian descent
Republican Party members of the United States House of Representatives from North Dakota
Republican Party United States senators from North Dakota
1876 United States presidential electors
Republican Party members of the Iowa House of Representatives
Republican Party Iowa state senators
People from Nelson County, North Dakota
People from Decorah, Iowa
19th-century American politicians
Iowa lawyers
North Dakota lawyers
University of Iowa College of Law alumni